Mohamed Sillah  (born August 15, 1983) is a Sierra Leonean international football (defender or defensive midfielder), who is currently playing for Scarborough Athletic in the English Northern Counties East Football League. He signed a short-term contract at the club after. Sillah has previously played in Turkey]] and Sweden. Sillah is also a member of the Leone Stars, the Sierra Leone national football team. He made his international debut for Sierra Leone in 2002. Before moving to Europe Sillah played for top Sierra Leone National Premier League club Bo Rangers and Diamond Stars. He is a member of the Susu ethnic group.

References

External links

Sierra Leonean footballers
Living people
Susu people
People from Bo, Sierra Leone
1983 births

Association football midfielders
Kuopion Palloseura players
Helsingin Jalkapalloklubi players